Lingui may refer to:
 Lingui District, a district in China
 Lingui, The Sacred Bonds, a 2021 film
 Rally for the Republic – Lingui, a political party of Chad

See also 
 Linguee
 Lingue (disambiguation)
 Linguine